The Ministry of Foreign Affairs is the national ministry of foreign affairs of Mauritania. It has its headquarters in Nouakchott, just to the northwest of the Nouakchott Convention Center complex.

List of ministers
This is a list of Ministers of Foreign Affairs of Mauritania:

1960–1962: Moktar Ould Daddah
1962–1963: Cheikhna Ould Mohamed Laghdaf
1963–1965: Mohamed Ould Dayin
1965............ Moktar Ould Daddah
1965–1966: Mohamed Ould Cheikh
1966............ Malum Ould Braham
1966–1968: Wane Birane Mamadou
1968–1970: Hamdi Ould Mouknass
1970–1971: Mohamed Moktar Ould Cheikh Abdellahi
1971–1978: Hamdi Ould Mouknass
1978–1979: Cheikhna Ould Mohamed Laghdaf
1979–1980: Ahmedou Ould-Abdallah
1980–1981: Mohamed Moktar Ould Zamil
1981............ Dahane Ould Ahmed Mahmoud
1981–1984: Ahmed Ould Minnih
1984............ Cheikh Sid'Ahmed Ould Babamine
1984–1986: Ahmed Ould Minnih
1986–1988: Mohamed Lemine Ould N'Diayane
1988–1989: Mohamed Sidina Ould Sidiya
1989–1990: Cheikh Sid'Ahmed Ould Baba
1990–1992: Hasni Ould Didi
1992............ Ismael Ould Yahi
1992–1993: Mohamed Abderrahmane Ould Moine
1993–1996: Mohamed Salem Ould Lekhal
1996–1997: Lemrabott Sidi Mahmoud Ould Cheikh Ahmed
1997............ Ahmed Sidi Ould Khalifa
1997............ Abdallahi Ould Nem
1997............ Sow Abou Demba
1997–1998: Mohamed El Hacen Ould Lebatt
1998............ Cheikh El Avia Ould Mohamed Khouna
1998–2001: Ahmed Ould Sid'Ahmed
2001–2002: Dah Ould Abdi
2002–2003: Mohamed Ould Tolba
2003–2005: Mohamed Vall Ould Bellal
2005–2007: Ahmed Ould Sid'Ahmed
2007–2008: Mohamed Saleck Ould Mohamed Lemine
2008............ Cheikh El Avia Ould Mohamed Khouna
2008............ Abdallahi Hassen Ben Hmeida
2008–2009: Mohamed Mahmoud Ould Mohamedou
2009–2011: Naha Mint Mouknass
2011–2013: Hamadi Ould Baba Ould Hamadi
2013–2015: Ahmed Ould Teguedi
2015............ Vatma Vall Mint Soueina
2015–2016: Hamadi Ould Meimou
2016–2018: Isselkou Ould Ahmed Izid Bih
2018–2022: Ismail Ould Cheikh Ahmed
2022–present: Mohamed Salem Ould Merzoug

References

Mauritania
Foreign relations of Mauritania
Ministry of Foreign Affairs
Mauritania, Foreign Affairs